Berbera is the capital of the Sahil region of Somaliland and is the main sea port of the country. Berbera is a coastal city and was the former capital of the British Somaliland protectorate before Hargeisa. It also served as a major port of the Ifat, Adal and Isaaq  sultanates from the 13th to 19th centuries.

In antiquity, Berbera was part of a chain of commercial port cities along the Somali seaboard. During the early modern period, Berbera was the most important place of trade in the Somali Peninsula. It later served as the capital of the British Somaliland protectorate from 1884 to 1941, when it was replaced by Hargeisa. In 1960, the British Somaliland protectorate gained independence as the State of Somaliland and united five days later with the Trust Territory of Somalia (the former Italian Somalia) to form the Somali Republic. Located strategically on the oil route, the city has a deep seaport, which serves as the region's main commercial harbour.

History

Antiquity

Berbera was part of the classical Somali city-states that engaged in a lucrative trade network connecting Somali merchants with Phoenicia, Ptolemic Egypt, Ancient Greece, Parthian Persia, Saba, Nabataea and the Roman Empire. Somali sailors used the ancient Somali maritime vessel known as the beden to transport their cargo.

Berbera preserves the ancient name of the coast along the southern shore of the Gulf of Aden. It is believed to be the ancient port of Malao described as 800 stadia beyond the city of the Avalites, described in the eighth chapter of the Periplus of the Erythraean Sea, which was written by a Greek merchant in the first century AD. In the Periplus it is described as:

Middle Ages

Duan Chengshi, a Chinese Tang dynasty scholar, described in his written work of AD 863 the slave trade, ivory trade, and ambergris trade of Bobali, which is thought to be Berbera. The great city was also later mentioned by the Islamic traveller Ibn Sa'id as well as Ibn Battuta in the thirteenth century.

In Abu'l-Fida's, A Sketch of the Countries, the present-day Gulf of Aden was called the Gulf of Berbera, which shows how important Berbera was in both regional and international trade during the medieval period.

Legendary Arab explorer Ahmad ibn Mājid wrote of Berbera and a few other notable landmarks and ports of the northern Somali coast and referred to what is now the Gulf of Aden as the Gulf of Berbera. He also included Zeila and its archipelago, Siyara, Heis, Alula, Ruguda, Maydh, El-Sheikh and El-Darad.

Berbera was an important and well built settlement that served as a major harbor port for several successive Somali Kingdoms in the Middle Ages like the early Adal Kingdom, Ifat Sultanate and Adal Sultanate.

Berbera, along with Zeila, were the two most important ports situated inside the Adal Sultanate, and they provided vital political and commercial links with the wider Islamic World:

Along with other ports and settlements in East Africa, explorers Ludovico di Varthema, Duarte Barbosa and Leo Africanus wrote brief accounts of the port town of Berbera in the early sixteenth century, mainly detailing her historic trading links with Aden and Khambat (Cambay).

Duarte Barbosa's brief account of Berbera:

Further on, on the same coast, is a town of the Moors [Muslims] called Barbara; it has a port, at which many ships of Adeni and Cambay touch with their merchandise, and from there those of Cambay carry away much gold, and ivory, and other things, and those of Aden take many provisions, meat, honey, and wax, because, as they say, it is a very abundant country.

Not long after their departure from Zeila and Berbera, the Portuguese fleet under Lopo Soares de Albergaria and António de Saldanha sacked both port towns between 1516 and 1518.     

According to Selman Reis, an ambitious Ottoman Red Sea admiral, Berbera was rich with pearls, and the amount of merchandise and trade consisting of "gold, musk and ivory" present at Berbera, on the Somali coast, was described by Selman as "limitless".

Early Modern to Pre-Colonial

One of the earliest pre colonial accounts comes from Ibrahim Punkar, who wrote a memoir in 1801 and letter in 1809 to the Governor of Bombay John Duncan. Noting that Berbera had 5-6 towers with armed guards, he would go to describe the trade and general outlook of the city. Further noting the Somali inhabitants adhering to the Shafi'i school of Sunni Islam significant trade came from Harar in the interior alongside Gondar and Shewa. Cloth, rice and tobacco came from Kutch in Gujarat and Muscat with Mocha, Jeddah and Al Mukalla being the source of dates and tin. Punkar stated that the Somalis of the area were skilled musketeers and possessed powerful cavalry and knowledge of archery, but were often internally divided except for when united against common enemies. All foreigners including Arabs and Indians who often frequented Berbera were prohibited from venturing further inland, lest they access the lucrative trade of Harar directly and bypass the Somalis.

One certainty about Berbera over the following centuries was that it was the site of an annual fair, held between October and April, which Mordechai Abir describes as "among the most important commercial events of the east coast of Africa." The major Somali sub-clans of the Isaaq in Somaliland, caravans from Harar and the interior, and Banyan merchants from Porbandar, Mangalore and Mumbai gathered to trade. All of this was kept secret from European merchants. Lieutenant C. J. Cruttenden, who wrote a memoir describing this portion of the Somali coast dated 12 May 1848, provided an account of the Berbera fair and an account of the historic environs of the town: "an aqueduct of stone and chunam, some nine miles [15 km] in length", which had once emptied into a presently dry reservoir adjacent to the ruins of a mosque. He explored part of its course from the reservoir past a number of tombs built of stones taken from the aqueduct to reach a spring, above which lay "the remains of a small fort or tower of chunam and stone ... on the hill-side immediately over the spring." Cruttenden noted that in "style it was different to any houses now found on the Somali coast", and concluded with noting the presence in "the neighbourhood of the fort above mentioned [an] abundance of broken glass and pottery ... from which I infer that it was a place of considerable antiquity; but, though diligent search was made, no traces of inscriptions could be discovered."

Berbera was the most important port in the Somali Peninsula between the 18th–19th centuries. For centuries, Berbera had extensive trade relations with several historic ports in Arabia and the Indian subcontinent. Additionally, the Somali and Ethiopian interiors were very dependent on Berbera for trade, where most of the goods for export arrived from. During the 1833 trading season, the port town swelled up to 70,000 people, and upwards of 6,000 camels laden with goods arrived from the interior within a single day. Berbera was the main marketplace in the entire Somali seaboard for various goods procured from the interior, such as livestock, coffee, frankincense, myrrh, acacia gum, saffron, feathers, wax, ghee, hide (skin), gold and ivory. In the trading season of 1840, French explorer Charles-Xavier Rochet d'Héricourt visited Berbera and estimated the total exports of the season to be around thirteen times greater than that of Massawa.

According to a trade journal published in 1856, Berbera was described as “the freest port in the world, and the most important trading place on the whole Arabian Gulf.”:

“The only seaports of importance on this coast are Feyla [Zeila] and Berbera; the former is an Arabian colony, dependent of Mocha, but Berbera is independent of any foreign power. It is, without having the name, the freest port in the world, and the most important trading place on the whole Arabian Gulf. From the beginning of November to the end of April, a large fair assembles in Berbera, and caravans of 6,000 camels at a time come from the interior loaded with coffee, (considered superior to Mocha in Bombay), gum, ivory, hides, skins, grain, cattle, and sour milk, the substitute of fermented drinks in these regions; also much cattle is brought there for the Aden market.”

Historically, the port of Berbera was controlled indigenously between the mercantile Reer Ahmed Nur (Ayyal Ahmed) and Reer Yunis Nuh (Ayyal Yunis) sub-clans of the Sa'ad Musa, Habr Awal. These two sub-clans effectively administered the trade of the town, especially in the dealings of all transactions and brokerage between various parties to issuing protection agreements towards the foreign Arab and Indian traders. In the year 1845, the two sub-clans had a dissension over the control of the trade of Berbera, which lead to a wider altercation where each side sought outside support. With the backing of Haji Sharmarke Ali Saleh, the Reer Ahmed Nuh drove out their kinsmen and declared themselves the sole commercial masters of Berbera. The defeated Reer Yunis Nuh moved westwards and established the port of Bulhar which later, for a brief period, became a trading rival to nearby Berbera. However, Sharmarke's actions was ultimately a political ruse to control Berbera for himself, which he ultimately achieved for several years.

Berbera commanded most of the trade traffic with the Somali and Ethiopian interiors. The two main caravan trade routes from Berbera extended to Harar and Shewa in the west, and to the Shebelle basin in the south (although some caravans traveled to/from as far as the Jubba River). Moreover, the inland caravan trade routes were also concurrently used as pilgrim routes during the trading season by Somali Hajj pilgrims who resided in the deep interior.

In addition, Mocha, Aden, Jeddah and several other ports in Arabia had constant contact with Berbera in regard to general trade and commerce. In the early years of the nineteenth century, the local Somalis of Berbera (Habr Awal clan) had a navigation act where they excluded Arab vessels and brought the goods and produce of the interior in their own ships to the Arabian ports:

Berbera held an annual fair during the cool rain-free months between October and April. This long drawn out market handled immense quantities of coffee, gum Arabic, myrrh and other commodities. These goods in the early nineteenth century were almost exclusively handled by Somalis who, Salt says, had "a kind of navigation act by which they exclude the Arab vessels from their ports and bring the produce of their country either to Aden or Mocha in their own dows."

In much of the 19th century, the trade between Berbera and Aden was so important to the later that when disturbances effected the Berbera trading season, Aden too suffered as a result. According to Captain Haines, who was then the colonial administrator of Aden (1839-1854), 80% of Aden's revenue in 1848 was derived from duties charged on imported goods from Berbera. Additionally, most of the coffee imported by Mocha (centre of the coffee trade in early modern times) arrived via Somali merchants from Berbera, who procured the coffee beans from the environs of Harar. Although the coffee beans were grown in Harar (present-day Ethiopia), the coffee was named Berbera Coffee in the international market, and the beans were considered superior to the locally grown varieties in Yemen.

The British explorer Richard Burton made two visits to this port, and his second visit was marred by an attack on his camp by a group of local Somali warriors, and although Burton was able to escape to Aden, one of his companions was killed. Burton, recognizing the importance of the port city wrote:

By 1869, a sub-clan of the Reer Ahmed Nur (Ayyal Ahmed, Habr Awal) were operating a fort in the port town and it was manned by several hired guards armed with muskets and fiercely loyal to them. A British officer visiting the city from Aden noted the guards would not betray the Reer Ahmed Nur save death.

Battle of Berbera

When a British vessel named the Mary Anne attempted to dock in Berbera's port in 1825 it was attacked and multiple members of the crew were massacred by the Habr Awal. In response the Royal Navy enforced a blockade and some accounts narrate a bombardment of the city. In 1827 two years later the British arrived and extended an offer to relieve the blockade which had halted Berbera's lucrative trade in exchange for indemnity. Following this offer the Battle of Berbera 1827 broke out. After the Habr Awal defeat, 15,000 Spanish dollars was to be paid by the Habr Awal leaders for the destruction of the ship and loss of life.

In the 1830s, the Isaaq Sultan Farah Guled and Haji Ali penned a letter to Sultan bin Saqr Al Qasimi of Ras Al Khaimah requesting military assistance and joint religious war against the British. This would not materialize as Sultan Saqr was incapacitated by prior Persian Gulf campaign of 1819 and was unable to send aid to Berbera. Alongside their stronghold in the Persian Gulf & Gulf of Oman the Qasimi were very active both militarily and economically in the Gulf of Aden and were given to plunder and attack ships as far west as the Mocha on the Red Sea. They had numerous commercial ties with the Somalis, leading vessels from Ras Al Khaimah and the Persian Gulf to regularly attend trade fairs in the large ports of Berbera and Zeila and were very familiar with the Isaaq.

British Somaliland

After signing successive treaties with the various clans of the northern Somali coast between 1884 and 1886, the British established a protectorate in the region referred to as British Somaliland. The British garrisoned the protectorate from Aden and administered it from their British India colony until 1898. British Somaliland was then administered by the Foreign Office until 1905 and afterwards by the Colonial Office.

Despite Berbera's strategic location, being the only port with a sheltered harbor on the southern side of the Gulf of Aden (the gateway to the Suez Canal), the British later came to regret their nominal control of the region. In fact, Winston Churchill once visited Berbera in 1907 when he was Under-Secretary of State for the Colonies, and he noted the protectorate be abandoned, since it was "unproductive, inhospitable, and the people are very hostile to occupation." The stated purposes of the establishment of the protectorate were to "secure a supply market and to exclude the interference of foreign powers." The British principally viewed the protectorate as a source for supplies of meat for their British Indian outpost in Aden through the maintenance of order in the coastal areas and protection of the caravan routes from the interior. Colonial administration during this period did not extend infrastructure beyond the coast (which left the Somali clans within the protectorate with greater autonomy), and contrasted with the more interventionist colonial experience of Italian Somalia. However, there were plans in the early days of the protectorate to invest in major infrastructure projects such as the abandoned Berbera-Harar Railway initiative, which was vetoed by parliament on the grounds that it would harm the cordial agreement (entente cordiale) between France and Britain.

In August 1940, during the East African Campaign, British Somaliland was briefly occupied by Italy after a large invasion force defeated British colonial troops at the Battle of Tug Argan. During this period, the British rounded up soldiers and governmental officials to evacuate them from the territory through Berbera. In total, 7,000 people, including civilians, were evacuated. The Somalis serving in the Somaliland Camel Corps were given the choice of evacuation or disbandment; the majority chose to remain and were allowed to retain their arms. In March 1941, the British forces recaptured the protectorate during Operation Appearance after a six-month occupation. The first WW2 Australian POWs were taken hostage here in 1940.

The British Somaliland protectorate gained its independence on 26 June 1960 as the State of Somaliland, before uniting as planned five days later with the Trust Territory of Somalia (the former Italian Somalia) to form the Somali Republic.

Modern

In the post-independence period, Berbera was administered as the part of the North-Western province of the Somali Republic. It served as the main livestock port of the republic and in the 1970s and 1980s, nearly all of the livestock exports went out through the port of Berbera via Isaaq livestock traders. The entire livestock exports accounted to upwards of 90% of the Somali Republic's entire export figures in a given year, and Berbera's exports alone provided over 75% of the nation's recorded foreign currency income at the time. The main consumers were the wealthy gulf states and Saudi Arabia in particular.

As early as 1962, The Soviet Union agreed to assist the nascent Somali Republic towards the construction of modern port facilities and a military base, which was completed in 1969 and was called on by sixteen Soviet Ships in 1971. Coinciding with the Ogaden War between The Somali Republic and Ethiopia in 1977, the Soviets left Berbera and the nation as a whole due to a disagreement, leaving the United States to arrive with a $40 million investment and new health facilities in 1980. By 1985, the city had an estimated population of 70,000, with the outbreak of the Somali National Movement (SNM) ousted government troops from the city following aerial bombardments and extrajudicial killings inflicted on the population by the government. With the downfall of General Siad Barre in 1991, the Northern region of the Somali Republic, declared the state of Somaliland, of Somalia. A slow process of infrastructural reconstruction subsequently began in Berbera and other towns in the region.

The city remains a competitive regional port and in 2016 a US$442 million agreement was reached between DP World and the government of Somalia. The deal involves enhancing and operating the regional trade and logistics hub at the Port of Berbera. The project, which will be phased in, will also involve the setting up of a free zone.

On 1 March 2018, Ethiopia became a major shareholder following an agreement with DP World and the Somaliland Port Authority. DP World holds a 51% stake in the project, Somaliland 30% and Ethiopia the remaining 19%. As part of the agreement, the government of Ethiopia will invest in infrastructure to develop the Berbera Corridor as a trade gateway for the inland country, which is one of the fastest growing countries in the world. There are also plans to construct an additional berth at the Port of Berbera, in line with the Berbera master plan, which DP World has started implementing, while adding new equipment to further improve efficiencies and productivity of the port.

On 24 June 2021, The CEO of DP World officially announced the second phase of the Berbera port upgrade during the inauguration ceremony for the completion of the first phase. The second phase includes extending the new quay from 400 to 1,000 metres, and adding seven more ship-to-shore gantry cranes, bringing the total to ten and enabling the expanded port to handle up to two million TEU containers a year.  

The agreement comes as part of a larger government-to-government Memorandum of understanding between Government of the United Arab Emirates and the Government of Somaliland to further strengthen their strategic ties. Somalia's attempts to obstruct and block the deal were frustrated and failed to stop the project from commencing.

A rail link to Addis Ababa the capital of Ethiopia has remained a point of discussion and may materialize

Geography

Location and habitat

Berbera is located in coastal region of northern Somalia. An old port city, it has the only sheltered harbour on the southern side of the Gulf of Aden. The landscape around town, along with Somaliland's coastal lowlands, is semi-arid land.

Popular local beaches, such as Bathela and Batalale, have earned the city the nickname Beach City.

Climate
Berbera features a hot arid climate (Köppen BWh). It has long, sweltering summers and short, hot winters, as well as very little rainfall. Average high temperatures consistently exceed  during nearly four months of summertime (June, July, August and September). During the coolest months of the year, average high temperatures remain above  and average low temperatures also surpass . Although rainfall is low, the relative humidity is very high throughout the year and the atmosphere is simultaneously moist. The combination of the desert heat and the excessive moisture make apparent temperatures reach extremely high levels. Annual average rainfall is minimal, with only  of precipitation. There are between 5 and 8 rainy days on average annually. Bright sunshine likely occur during about 84% of the total daytime hours and average annual cloudiness is very low.

Demographics

Historically, Berbera was inhabited by the Reer Ahmed Nuh and Yunis Nuh lineages of the Sa'ad Musa, Habr Awal.

In more recent times, however, the Issa Musa sub-clan of the Habr Awal have come to make up the majority of the town's inhabitants, while the Habr Yunis, primarily belonging to the Musa Abdallah branch and the Habr Je'lo are also present.

Education 
There are 30 primary schools operating in Berbera city totaling 63,641 students. The broader Berbera district has 49 schools serving 90,310 students.

Economy
A number of products are exported through the Port of Berbera, including livestock, gum arabic, frankincense, and myrrh. Its seaborne trade is chiefly with Jeddah in Saudi Arabia, and Aden in Yemen,  to the north. Additionally, goods from Ethiopia are also exported through the facility. The seaside boasts watersport tourist activity such as scuba diving, snorkeling, surfing and coral reefs.

Transportation

Berbera is the terminus of roads from Hargeisa and Burco. The city has one of Somaliland's major class seaports, the Port of Berbera. It historically served as a naval and missile base for the Somali government. Following an agreement between the Somali Republic and the USSR in 1962, the port's facilities were patronized by the Soviets and was later significantly upgraded in 1969. The Berbera seaport was later expanded for U.S. military use, after the Somali authorities strengthened ties with the American government.

For air transportation, the city is served by the Berbera Airport. It has an extensive  runway.

References

External links

Berbera - Coordinates

Populated places in Sahil, Somaliland
Gulf of Aden
Port cities in Africa
Cities in Somaliland
Articles containing video clips
Cities of the Adal Sultanate
British Somaliland in World War II
Isaaq Sultanate